Sun Hill or Sunhill may refer to:

 Sunhill, hamlet in the English county of Gloucestershire
 Sun Hill, Georgia, an unincorporated community
 Sun Hill, West Virginia, unincorporated community in Wyoming County, West Virginia, United States
 Sun Hill (The Bill), a fictional location in The Bill, a British TV series

See also
 Sunninghill (disambiguation)
 Sunny Hill (disambiguation)